Ross E. McKinney is an American scientist and professor of environmental engineering.  He is best known for his contributions to the biological engineering of wastewater treatment.

McKinney was a member of faculty of the Massachusetts Institute of Technology when he moved to the University of Kansas to begin the program in environmental engineering.  Before he retired in 1993, McKinney held the first NT Veatch Distinguished Professorship of Civil Engineering.

McKinney was elected a member of the National Academy of Engineering in 1977 for contributions to the development of biological wastewater treatment processes and to the advancement of the environmental engineering profession.

References 

Environmental engineers
Living people
University of Kansas faculty
Members of the United States National Academy of Engineering
Year of birth missing (living people)